Alexander Heid is an American computer security consultant, white hat hacker, and business executive.

Heid is a co-founder of the South Florida hacker conference and hacker group known as HackMiami, and currently serves as the chief research officer of the New York City information security firm SecurityScorecard.

Early life and education
Alexander Heid grew up in Miami, Florida and attended Barbara Goleman Senior High School.

Career
Alexander Heid currently serves as chief research officer of the New York City information security firm SecurityScorecard. Heid joined the company in 2014, working directly with Aleksandr Yampolskiy and Sam Kassoumeh to develop the signal collection methodologies that powers the cyber threat intelligence and third party management aspects of the platform.

Heid is documented as being one of the first researchers to attribute the Equifax data breach to a vulnerability in Apache Struts 2 within the first hours of the breach announcement.

Prior to SecurityScorecard, Heid was the head of threat intelligence at Prolexic. Heid developed counterattack and neutralization methodologies against DDoS campaigns by discovering vulnerabilities in the attacker's botnet command and control servers.

During the time at Prolexic, Heid was involved in the defense and mitigation of the Operation Ababil campaigns that were targeting the financial sector.

Additionally, Heid has held senior security roles within the banking industry, specializing in web application vulnerability analysis and botnet cyber threat intelligence. Heid has given multiple presentations at hacker conferences demonstrating exploitable vulnerabilities within crimeware applications that can be leveraged by white hat researchers for the purposes of attribution and threat neutralization.

Heid is also the author of the 2013 cryptocurrency threat intelligence report, "Analysis of the Cryptocurrency Marketplace," which was the first forensic report about malware threats relating to blockchain technologies. The report is ranked as one of the Top 1000 'Most Cited Blockchain Publications' by BlockchainLibrary.

References 

Living people
Hackers
American technology executives
People in information technology
Year of birth missing (living people)